Monte Tredenus is a mountain of Lombardy, Italy. It has an elevation of 2,796 metres above sea level

Mountains of the Alps
Mountains of Lombardy